Kojo Antwi, also known as "Mr. Music Man", is a Ghanaian Afro pop, highlife and reggae musical artist. Born Julius Kojo Antwi into a family of 13 siblings, he grew up in Darkuman a suburb of Accra. He has 22 albums to his name, with "Tom & Jerry" became one of his most popular songs in West Africa Ghana.A former Ghamro chairman

Career 

After leaving school, Kojo Antwi started his music career immediately by playing with the band Boomtalents. Later, he became the front-man of Classique Vibes, formerly known as Classique Handles. Eventually, Kojo went solo. His first solo album, All I Need is You, which was released in 1986, became a chartbuster in Ghana. His music is a blend of Ghanaian highlife, Congolese soukous, Caribbean lovers rock, and African American soul and R&B.

He sings in Ghana's dominant language, Twi. In June 2018, the Ghanaian record producer cum Musician started a tour of the US.

Personal life 
His father, Opanin Kwadwo Asiama Asubonten died on 2 January 2023 at the Police Hospital in Accra.

Discography 
 Studio albums
 All I Need is You (1986)
 Anokye (1989)
 Mr Music Man (1992)
   Groovy (1994)
 To Mother Afrika (1995)
 Superman (1998)
 Afrafra (1999)
 Don't Stop the Music (2000)
 Akuaba (2000)
 Densu (2002)
 Alpha (Compilation) (2003)
 Tattoo (2006)
 Mwaaah! (2009)

Awards 
Antwi has received the West Africa Tourism Award, All Africa Music Awards, Kora Award, and the Our Music Award.

References

Ghanaian record producers
Ghanaian musicians
Living people
Year of birth missing (living people)